is a Japanese film producer. His wife, Fran Rubel Kuzui, has also directed movies.

Along with his wife, Kaz founded Kuzui Enterprises, which distributes US films in Japan and imports Japanese films for the US market.  In addition to holding a portion of rights to the character of Buffy the Vampire Slayer, Kuzui was also given an executive producer credit for the TV series and its spin-off Angel, despite having no practical role in either production.  In 2018, Kuzui and his wife are reported to be involved in the development of a reboot of Buffy.

References

External links 
 

Year of birth missing (living people)
Living people
Japanese film producers
Place of birth missing (living people)